The Journal of Toxicology and Environmental Health is a peer-reviewed public health journal covering environmental toxicology. It was established in 1975 and in 1998 was split into Part A: Current Issues and Part B: Critical Reviews. According to the Journal Citation Reports, Part A has a 2012 impact factor of 1.733, whereas Part B has a 2012 impact factor of 3.896.

References

External links
 

Environmental toxicology
Taylor & Francis academic journals
Biweekly journals
Publications established in 1975
English-language journals
Toxicology journals
Environmental health journals